In college football, 2019 NCAA football bowl games may refer to:

2018–19 NCAA football bowl games, for games played in January 2019 as part of the 2018 season.
2019–20 NCAA football bowl games, for games played in December 2019 as part of the 2019 season.